A hair receiver is a small pot, typically made of ceramic, bronze, or crystal, with a hole in the lid, kept on the dressing table in the Victorian era to store hair removed from brushes and combs.

History 
Hair receivers were a receptacle with a finger-wide whole in the top to allow for the collected hair to be fed into the box. These ratts could also be made by weaving or plaiting the collected hair. These ratts helped in achieving the high and filled out hairstyles which were fashionable in the Victorian era. The desire for changing the shape of the hair and head was linked, by one writer, to the Victorian fascination with phrenology.

Some hair would be kept to make hair jewellery and was also used for stuffing pincushions and small furnishing cushions as human hair was softer than the alternative, feathers.

These receivers were often paired with a matching trinket box or a powder jar or as part of a dressing table set, made mainly from porcelain, though glass, metal, and celluloid were also used. Glass receivers were often topped with silver or silver plate. They were most commonly round or oval.

The use of hair receivers fell into decline in the early 20th century, with shorter hairstyles becoming more fashionable.

References

Victorian era